Enteucha terricula is a moth of the family Nepticulidae. It was described by Puplesis and Robinson in 2000. It is known from Peru.

References

Nepticulidae
Moths of South America
Moths described in 2000